Robert Johnson (born May 27, 1995) is an American professional basketball player who last played for ADA Blois Basket 41 of the French Pro A. He played college basketball for the Indiana Hoosiers.

College career
Johnson averaged 12.8 points and 2.5 assists per game as a junior at Indiana. He declared for the NBA draft but opted to return to the Hoosiers. As a senior, Johnson averaged 14.0 points, 4.5 rebounds and 2.7 assists per game. Johnson was named honorable mention All-Big Ten by the coaches. He finished 21st in career scoring at Indiana with 1,413 points.

Professional career
After going undrafted in the 2018 NBA Draft, he represented the Atlanta Hawks during the NBA summer league in Las Vegas and Salt Lake City. Johnson played for the Wisconsin Herd in his rookie season, averaging 7.3 points, 2.7 rebounds and 1.9 assists per game. On August 8, 2019, he joined the Polish team MKS Dąbrowa Górnicza.

On December 15, 2019, he has signed with Parma of the VTB United League. Johnson signed a two-year extension with Parma on July 16, 2020.

On January 21, 2021, he has signed with Lokman Hekim Fethiye Belediyespor of the Turkish BSL. Johnson subsequently joined averaged 19.7 points, 4.9 rebounds and 4.1 assists per game. Pallacanestro Cantù and On January 19, 2022, he signed with Legia Warszawa of the Polish Basketball League.

On August 1, 2022, he signed with Napoli Basket of the Italian Lega Basket Serie A (LBA).

On January 9, 2023, he signed with ADA Blois Basket 41 of the French Pro A.

References

External links 
Indiana Hoosiers bio

1995 births
Living people
American men's basketball players
American expatriate basketball people in Italy
American expatriate basketball people in Poland
American expatriate basketball people in Russia
American expatriate basketball people in Turkey
Basketball players from Richmond, Virginia
Indiana Hoosiers men's basketball players
Legia Warsaw (basketball) players
MKS Dąbrowa Górnicza (basketball) players
Napoli Basket players
Parma Basket players
Shooting guards
Wisconsin Herd players